There have been two baronetcies created for persons with the surname Mildmay, one in the Baronetage of England and one in the Baronetage of Great Britain. Both are extinct.

The Mildmay Baronetcy, of Moulsham in the County of Essex, was created in the Baronetage of England on 29 June 1611 for Thomas Mildmay, previously Member of Parliament for Maldon. He was the grandson of Sir Thomas Mildmay, Auditor of the Court of Augmentation, elder brother of Sir Walter Mildmay. The title became extinct on his death in 1626. Mildmay's brother Henry Mildmay claimed the barony of FitzWalter. In 1667 Henry's grandson Benjamin Mildmay was confirmed in the title.

The Mildmay Baronetcy, of Moulsham in the County of Essex, was created in the Baronetage of Great Britain on 5 February 1765 for William Mildmay. He was a descendant of William Mildmay, uncle of the first Baronet of the 1611 creation. The title became extinct on his death in 1771. The late devolved his estates to his kinsman Carew Mildmay, who in his turn bequeathed the estates to his grand-niece, Jane Mildmay, wife of Sir Henry St John, 2nd Baronet, whose son Sir Henry St John-Mildmay, 3rd Baronet assumed the additional surname of Mildmay (see St John-Mildmay Baronets for further history of this title).

Mildmay baronets, of Moulsham (1611)

Sir Thomas Mildmay, 1st Baronet (died 1626)

Mildmay baronets, of Moulsham (1765)
Sir William Mildmay, 1st Baronet (–1771)

See also
Baron FitzWalter
St John-Mildmay baronets

References

 

Extinct baronetcies in the Baronetage of England
Extinct baronetcies in the Baronetage of Great Britain
1611 establishments in England